Downtown Baptist Church, is a historic church building located at 101 W. McBee Avenue in Greenville, South Carolina. It was constructed in 1858 as the new home of First Baptist Church of Greenville, replacing an earlier structure on the banks of the Reedy River. The congregation of First Baptist Church vacated the site for a new campus on Cleveland Street in the late 1970s at which time a minority of the congregation elected to remain at the downtown site and start a new church under the name Downtown Baptist Church.

The Greek Revival building, designed by architect Samuel Sloan, was built in 1858 and added to the National Register of Historic Places in 1977. In 2011, the building was renovated, removing side galleries and balconies that were added in 1915. It is now the home of Grace Church.

References

Baptist churches in South Carolina
Churches on the National Register of Historic Places in South Carolina
Churches completed in 1858
19th-century Baptist churches in the United States
Churches in Greenville County, South Carolina
National Register of Historic Places in Greenville, South Carolina